Buttelstedt is a town and a former municipality in the Weimarer Land district, in Thuringia, Germany. It is situated 11 km north of Weimar. Since 1 January 2019, it is part of the municipality Am Ettersberg.

History
Within the German Empire (1871-1918), Buttelstedt was part of the Grand Duchy of Saxe-Weimar-Eisenach.

Notable people from Buttelstedt

August Wilhelm Hupel (1737-1819), publicist, estophile and linguist
Johann Friedrich Fasch (1688-1758), baroque musician and composer
Johann Ludwig Krebs (1713-1780), composer

References

Towns in Thuringia
Weimarer Land
Grand Duchy of Saxe-Weimar-Eisenach
Former municipalities in Thuringia